The Russian conquest of Bukhara was a series of wars, invasions, and the subsequent conquest of the Central Asian Emirate of Bukhara by the Russian Empire.

War 
The nomads of central Asia, who had produced great conquerors in the distant past, were little match for the disciplined armies of the 19th century. Raids by Muslim guerillas encouraged local Russian governors to take the initiative in subduing the central Asian khanates of Khiva and Bukhara. Envoys from Russia and Britain to Bukhara were treated with arrogance and contempt, and in 1848 two British officers were imprisoned and killed. In the early 1860s the Bukharans managed to fend off Russian advances, but in May 1866 they were defeated. The Russians then established a governor-general of Turkestan, on Syr Darya. The war resumed in 1868, when the Emir was forced to accept vassal status after the Battle of Zerabulak.

See also
Russian conquest of Turkestan

Further reading 

Conflicts in 1842
Conflicts in 1866
Conflicts in 1868
1842 in Asia
1866 in Asia
1868 in Asia
1842 in the Russian Empire
1866 in the Russian Empire
1868 in the Russian Empire
History of Bukhara
Territorial evolution of Russia